Walter Kenneth Little (born 14 October 1969) is a rugby union player from New Zealand.
He was known for his combination with Frank Bunce.

Walter Little made his All Blacks debut in 1989 from the Glenfield Rugby Club in the North Harbour club competition.

External links 
 
Walter Kenneth Little at New Zealand Rugby History

1969 births
Living people
Rugby union players from Tokoroa
New Zealand international rugby union players
New Zealand rugby union players
People educated at Hato Petera College, Auckland
Rugby union centres